Rafe Roys Mazzeo (born 1961) is an American mathematician working in differential geometry, microlocal analysis, and partial differential equations. He is currently a professor of mathematics. He served as the department chair at Stanford University from 2007-2010 and 2019-2022.

Education and career
Mazzeo obtained his B.S. degree from MIT in 1982. He completed his Ph.D. in mathematics at MIT under the supervision of Richard Burt Melrose in 1986. His Ph.D. thesis was titled "Hodge cohomology of negatively curved manifolds." After obtaining his Ph.D. degree, Mazzeo joined Stanford University, where he became a full professor in 1997.

Contributions
Mazzeo has published more than 150 mathematics papers, and his work has been cited more than 5000 times. His work has been published in many prestigious mathematics journals, including Annals of Mathematics, Inventiones Mathematicae, and Duke Mathematical Journal. He has had 11 doctoral students. He is one of the founders of the Stanford University Mathematics Camp. He is Faculty Director of the Stanford Online High School, and has been Director of the IAS/Park City Mathematics Institute since 2015.

Awards and fellowships
Mazzeo has received many awards, including a National Science Foundation Postdoctoral Fellowship, Alfred P. Sloan Foundation Research Fellowship, National Science Foundation Young Investigator Fellowship, and Louis and Claude Rosenberg Jr. University Fellowship in Undergraduate Education.

In 2013, he became a fellow of the American Mathematical Society. He was elected as a Member of the American Academy of Arts and Sciences in 2022.

Selected publications

References

External links
 Rafe Mazzeo's Home Page

1961 births
Massachusetts Institute of Technology alumni
Stanford University faculty
Differential geometers
20th-century American mathematicians
21st-century American mathematicians
Mathematicians from Massachusetts
Living people
Fellows of the American Mathematical Society
Scientists from Boston
Sloan Fellows
{[Category:Fellow of the American Academy of Arts and Sciences]}